Jens Kuross is an American singer-songwriter and musician based in Idaho. He is an active member of The Acid and has previously performed as a member of Howling and RY X.

Personal life 

Jens was born in Seattle, Washington, but moved to Ketchum, Idaho with his family a few years later.  Jens began his career as a professional musician at the age of 15 when he began drumming for a jazz trio at a local hotel lounge/bar named the Duchin room (named after the wife of American pianist and bandleader Eddie Duchin). He would hold this gig down for the rest of his teens, playing and studying under the watchful eye of the gig's bassist, Jeff Rew, a former session player from San Diego who had spent time on the road with both Elvis Presley and the Buddy Rich big band.

After graduating from Wood River High School, Jens moved to Boston to study at the Berklee College of Music, graduating in 2005 with a degree in jazz drum set performance. He then moved to Los Angeles where began playing in the local Jazz scene and working as a session musician.  He earned a master's degree from Azusa Pacific University in Jazz Performance in 2013.

Career 
In 2016, Jens Kuross released his self-titled debut EP via London-based record label Aesop. It gained favourable reviews from a number of high-profile blogs and publications, including The Line Of Best Fit and DIY Magazine.

In 2017, Kuross supported DJ/producer Bonobo (musician) on his sold-out European tour. Later that year, Jens became a full-time member of The Acid, and his single "Spiraling" was featured in the closing credits of an episode of Lucifer (TV series).

In April 2018, Kuross released his new EP, 'Art! at the expense of mental health, Vol. 1'. He supported the release by embarking on European support tours with Rhye and Mercury Prize-nominated Jazz trio GoGo Penguin, before returning to England to play a sold-out headline show at London's Servant Jazz Quarters.

In October 2018, Kuross released the second instalment of his 'Art! at the expense of mental health' project, 'Art! at the expense of mental health, Vol. 2'.

In April 2019, Jens Kuross released his new single, 'Give Me Your Ghost'.

Alongside his solo endeavours, Kuross has forged a successful career as a studio and touring musician. He has performed and recorded with both Howling and RY X, alongside his time spent recording drum, percussion and keyboard parts for numerous LA-based jazz musicians and ensembles.

Kuross released his debut album, The Man Nobody Can Touch, on 25 September 2020.

Discography

Albums

Extended plays

Singles

References

External links 
 

Living people
People from Seattle
Year of birth missing (living people)
Singer-songwriters from Washington (state)